WATC-DT (channel 57) is a religious broadcasting independent television station in Atlanta, Georgia, United States. Owned by Carolina Christian Broadcasting, the station maintains studios on Enterprise Drive in Norcross, and its transmitter is located on Sweat Mountain in northeastern Cobb County, near the Cherokee County line.

WATC broadcasts programming from various Christian television networks, including World Harvest Television, The Inspiration Network, The Worship Network, Golden Eagle and The Shepherd's Chapel.

History
In 1996, WATC was the last of the Atlanta media market's 13 full-power TV stations to sign on.

WATC granted permission to simulcast its signal on WSKC-CA (channel 22, also licensed to Atlanta), so that station could maintain its Class A status. WSKC-CA was located on the same broadcast tower as WATC, and could continue broadcasting in analog even after WATC went digital-only in February 2009. However, it was off-air as of March 2009, and remained so for most of the year. Since then, the station has moved to transmit digitally from a location near Norcross as WSKC-CD, and now airs Korean programming as it had previously done on analog before its affiliation with WATC.

Despite the DTV Delay Act extending the deadline from February 17 to June 12, the station ended analog service on the original date. On June 18, it changed its broadcast callsign from the unsuffixed WATC it has since the beginning, a few days after the Federal Communications Commission (FCC) announced that TV stations were free to add or drop "-DT" as easily as "-TV". 
 
It has also received a construction permit for a fill-in broadcast translator in Union City, Georgia (southwestern metro Atlanta) on channel 36, which was vacated by analog WATL. It will have the same callsign as its parent station (with no extra numerals or other differentiation, despite not being a same-channel booster) and could not be sold separately, as it is within a program the FCC created in 2009 in order to address the shortcomings of the ATSC digital broadcast television system. Since ATSC is very prone to multipath interference, this may be due to reflected signals from the skyscrapers of downtown Atlanta and midtown Atlanta, as well as terrain shielding of the Chattahoochee River valley and the hills around it.

WATC is seen in rural parts of northwestern Georgia on WKSY-LD subchannel 21.4, from Summerville.

The station formerly had another translator station, W42AO, licensed to Athens, Georgia. That station became WAGC-LD. Owner Carolina Christian Broadcasting, Inc. also owns WGGS-TV, its sister station in Greenville, South Carolina.

In early May 2011, the station added other religious programming called "WATC too" on new channel 57.2.

Technical information

Subchannels
The station's digital signal is multiplexed:

Analog-to-digital conversion
WATC shut down its analog signal, over UHF channel 57, on February 17, 2009, to conclude the federally mandated transition from analog to digital television. The station's digital signal remained on its pre-transition UHF channel 41, using PSIP to display WATC's virtual channel as 57 on digital television receivers, which was among the high band UHF channels (52-69) that were removed from broadcasting use as a result of the transition.

References

External links

Television stations in Georgia (U.S. state)
Independent television stations in the United States
Television channels and stations established in 1996
1996 establishments in Georgia (U.S. state)
ATC-DT
Religious television stations in the United States